Courtney Fitzroy Senior (born 30 June 1997) is an English professional footballer who plays as a winger for Barnet.

He is a product of the Brentford Academy and made his professional debut on loan at League Two club Wycombe Wanderers in February 2015. He joined Colchester United in June 2016, where he made 145 appearances and scored 14 goals in five years with the club.

Career

Brentford
Born in Croydon, Senior began his career in the Brentford Academy. He was a member of the Brentford under-15 team that triumphed in the Junior category of the 2012 Milk Cup and during the 2012–13 season he broke into the youth team and also made four appearances for the Development Squad. After signing a two-year scholarship deal in the summer of 2013, Senior topped the youth team appearance charts during the 2013–14 season with 25 appearances. After 25 youth and Development Squad appearances during the 2014–15 season, Senior signed a two-year Development Squad contract in June 2015.

Senior made first team debut for Brentford in a 4–0 League Cup defeat by Oxford United on 11 August 2015, starting the match and playing for 75-minutes before being substituted for Akaki Gogia. He was an unused substitute on two further occasions in August 2015, but failed to make an appearance. After scoring two goals in 15 Development Squad appearances during the 2015–16 season, Senior departed Brentford on 28 June 2016, having made just one first team appearance at Griffin Park.

Wycombe Wanderers loan
Senior signed for League Two side Wycombe Wanderers on a one-month youth loan on 9 January 2015. He made the first professional appearance of his career on 10 February 2015, coming on as a second-half substitute for Fred Onyedinma during a 2–0 home defeat by Plymouth Argyle. He returned to his parent club the following day.

Colchester United
On 28 June 2016, Senior joined League Two club Colchester United on a two-year contract. Before he could receive a call into the first team squad, Senior was ruled out of the 2016–17 season after undergoing knee surgery in August 2016. He returned to fitness in July 2017 and made his debut for the club as an 85th-minute substitute for Drey Wright in a league match versus Forest Green Rovers on 26 August 2017. Five minutes later, in injury time, Senior scored the first professional goal of his career with a tap-in. He broke into the squad on a full-time basis in January 2018 and signed a new two-year contract on 18 April. Senior finished the 2017–18 season with 19 appearances and four goals. 2018–19 proved to be Senior's breakthrough season and he made 47 appearances and scored six goals on his way to winning the club's Young Player of the Year award.

At the end of the 2020–21 season, Senior was released by Colchester United. He had scored 14 goals in 145 appearances for the U's in five years with the club.

Newport County
On 6 July 2021, Senior joined fellow League Two side Newport County on a one-year deal. On 28 July 2021 Senior sustained a pre-season cruciate ligament injury which ruled him out of action for six to nine months. Although he returned to training towards the end of the season, Senior never played a competitive game for Newport and he was released by Newport County at the end of the 2021–22 season.

AFC Wimbledon 
On 1 October 2022, Senior joined AFC Wimbledon on a short-term deal. He scored his first goal for the club on 29 October 2022 in a 3-2 win over Harrogate Town. Senior left the Dons upon the expiry of his contract on 31 January 2023.

Barnet 
Senior signed for Barnet on 18 February 2023.

Career statistics

Honours

 Colchester United Young Player of the Year: 2018–19

References

External links

 

1997 births
Living people
Footballers from Croydon
English footballers
English people of Jamaican descent
Black British sportspeople
Association football forwards
Association football wingers
AFC Wimbledon players 
Brentford F.C. players
Wycombe Wanderers F.C. players
Colchester United F.C. players
Newport County A.F.C. players
Barnet F.C. players
English Football League players
National League (English football) players